Jerod A. Turner (born March 4, 1975) is an American professional golfer.

Turner was born in Oak Harbor, Washington. He turned professional in 2000 and played on mini-tours until qualifying for the 2009 Nationwide Tour.

Turner won the inaugural Soboba Classic on the Nationwide Tour in 2009 and finished 15th on the money list to earn his 2010 PGA Tour card.

Turner lives in Hurst, Texas with his wife and two children.

Professional wins (3)

Nationwide Tour wins (1)

Other wins (2)
2000 Waterloo Open
2004 Waterloo Open

See also
2009 Nationwide Tour graduates

External links

American male golfers
PGA Tour golfers
Korn Ferry Tour graduates
Golfers from Washington (state)
Golfers from Texas
People from Oak Harbor, Washington
People from Hurst, Texas
1975 births
Living people